Mary Isobel Sugden (21 July 19221 July 2009), known professionally as Mollie Sugden was an English actress. She was best known for being an original cast member in the British sitcom Are You Being Served? (1972–1985) as senior saleswoman Mrs. Slocombe and appeared reprising the character in the AYBS spin-off Grace & Favour (1992–1993). 

She is also well known for playing Nellie Harvey in Coronation Street (1965–1976), Mrs Hutchinson in The Liver Birds (1971–1996), Ida Willis in That's My Boy (1981–1986) and Nora Powers in My Husband and I (1987–1988).

Early life
Sugden was born on 21 July 1922 in Keighley, West Riding of Yorkshire. When she was 4 years old, she heard a woman reading a poem at a village concert making people laugh. The following Christmas, after being asked if she could "do anything", Sugden read this poem and everyone fell about laughing. She later remarked that their response made her "realise how wonderful it was to make people laugh". Shortly after she left school, World War II broke out, and Sugden worked in a munitions factory in Keighley making shells for the Royal Navy. She was later made redundant, and attended the Guildhall School of Music and Drama in London.

Early career
When Sugden graduated from the Guildhall School of Drama, she worked in repertory for eight years with a company that included Eric Sykes and Roy Dotrice. She also had work in radio and made her television debut in a live half-hour comedy show. Sugden's other appearances before Are You Being Served? included parts in The Benny Hill Show, Just Jimmy (with Jimmy Clitheroe), Z-Cars, Up Pompeii!, The Goodies, Steptoe and Son and five episodes of Jackanory in 1968.

Television
Sugden's first regular sitcom role was as Mrs Crispin in the sitcom Hugh and I (1962–1967). This was written by John T. Chapman, and when he became involved with The Liver Birds series, he suggested Sugden for the role of Sandra's mother, Mrs Hutchinson. She appeared in the bulk of the run, from 1971 to 1979.

In 1972, she starred in the Show 'Six Days of Justice', in the episode 'A Private Nuisance' .

In 1973, she appeared in Son of the Bride.

Meanwhile, she was cast in a role which brought her international fame: Mrs Slocombe, a department store saleswoman with a socially superior attitude, a repertoire of double entendres, and a penchant for bouffant, pastel-coloured coiffures, in the long-running Are You Being Served? (1972–1985). In 1978, when it was thought that Are You Being Served? was over, she was the lead star in Come Back Mrs. Noah, a sitcom that is regarded by some as one of the worst ever made. From 1965 to 1976, she intermittently played Nellie Harvey, the landlady of The Laughing Donkey pub, in Coronation Street. In this she often appeared opposite Annie Walker, landlady of the Rovers Return. In 1986, she had a 23-week stint on That's Life!

Sugden also played main roles in other sitcoms, including That's My Boy (1981–1986) and My Husband and I (1987–1988), both for ITV. In an unsuccessful revival of The Liver Birds (1996), Sugden reprised her role as Mrs Hutchinson, despite being on steroids at the time owing to her suffering from polymyalgia.

She played opposite her husband, William Moore (1916–2000), in several series, including two episodes of The Liver Birds and again in My Husband and I, on both occasions as a married couple. They married on 29 March 1958, having met while in repertory theatre in Swansea, and had twin sons born in October 1963, Robin and Simon. She has 5 grandchildren.

Radio
Sugden appeared alongside Deryck Guyler in two series of the sitcom Home to Roost on BBC Radio 4 in 1974 and 1975. She also played Mrs Fox in the radio version of Dad's Army from 1975 to 1976.

Later years and death
Seven years after the end of Are You Being Served?, five members of the original cast – including Sugden – came together to appear in Grace & Favour, where the staff of Grace Brothers are left an old manor house in the country, which they try to run as a hotel. It ran for two series, until 1993. Other appearances at this time included Just William and Oliver's Travels. In 2003, Sugden appeared in an episode of The Bill and also appeared (as herself) in an episode of the comedy sketch show Little Britain.

In 2002, a tribute programme called Celebrating Mollie Sugden: An Are You Being Served? Special, aired on American PBS stations featuring several members of the cast of Are You Being Served?

She lived for some years in Port St Mary on the Isle of Man, but later returned to live in England.

Sugden died on 1 July 2009, at the age of 86, within the Royal Surrey County Hospital in Guildford, Surrey, of unspecified heart failure and was cremated. Her final public appearance was at the funeral of her Are You Being Served? co-star Wendy Richard four months previously.

Filmography

Film

Television

References

External links

 interview British Entertainment History Project

1922 births
2009 deaths
20th-century English actresses
21st-century English actresses
Actresses from Bradford
Actresses from Yorkshire
Alumni of the Guildhall School of Music and Drama
British comedy actresses
English film actresses
English radio actresses
English stage actresses
English soap opera actresses
English television actresses
English voice actresses
People from Keighley